Fighter Squadron 71 or VF-71 was an aviation unit of the United States Navy. Originally established as Bombing Squadron 7 (VB-7) on 1 July 1939, it was redesignated as VF-71 on 5 November 1940 and disestablished on 7 January 1943. It was the first US Navy squadron to be designated as VF-71.

Operational history

Wasp was transferred to the Pacific Fleet in June 1942 and supported the invasion of Guadalcanal in August 1942. Many of the squadron's aircraft were lost in the sinking of the Wasp on 15 September 1942. The squadron was then land-based at Palikulo Bay Airfield on Espiritu Santo, and some supplemented the defense of Guadalcanal as part of the Cactus Air Force. VF-71 scored seven kills before its disestablishment.

See also
History of the United States Navy
List of inactive United States Navy aircraft squadrons
List of United States Navy aircraft squadrons

References

Strike fighter squadrons of the United States Navy